Rostkovia tristanensis is a species of flowering plant in the family Juncaceae, the rushes. It is endemic to Tristan da Cunha, where it occurs only on the main island and Gough Island. It grows in heath habitat with Empetrum. It is not uncommon on Gough Island, but it is rarely seen in flower.

References

Juncaceae
Flora of Tristan da Cunha
Data deficient plants
Plants described in 1944
Taxonomy articles created by Polbot